Tritia louisi is a species of sea snail, a marine gastropod mollusk in the family Nassariidae, the Nassa mud snails or dog whelks.

Description
The shell grows to a length of 6 mm.

Distribution
This species occurs in the Eastern Mediterranean Sea off Syria.

References

 Gofas, S.; Le Renard, J.; Bouchet, P. (2001). Mollusca, in: Costello, M.J. et al. (Ed.) (2001). European register of marine species: a check-list of the marine species in Europe and a bibliography of guides to their identification. Collection Patrimoines Naturels, 50: pp. 180–213
 Nofroni, I.; Savona, S. (1987). Nassarius zambakidisi new species from the Eastern Mediterranean. La Conchiglia. 218-219: 6-7

External links
 Pallary P., 1912b: Liste des Mollusques marins des côtes de la Syrie; Feuille des Jeunes Naturalistes 42: 171–174
 Aissaoui C., Galindo L.A., Puillandre N. & Bouchet P. (2017). The nassariids from the Gulf of Gabès revisited (Neogastropoda, Nassariidae). Marine Biology Research. 13(4): 370-389
 

Nassariidae
Gastropods described in 1912